The elections to the Eighth Kerala Assembly were held on  March 23, 1987. The UDF and the LDF were the two major political  fronts in the arena. The UDF had the INC(I),  IUML, KC(J), KC(M), NDP (P), SRP(S) and the RSP(S) as its constituents. The LDF consisted of the CPI(M), CPI, RSP, IC(S), Janata Party and the Lok Dal.

Background 
Kerala saw polarisation and splits of political forces since the formation of the United Democratic Front  Ministry on May 24, 1982. The merger of the two factions of the Indian National Congress, the INC (I) and the INC (A), in November 1982 marked the beginning of the political polarization.

Another important event was the reunion of the IUML and the AIML in August 1985. Before the election, the Kerala Congress once again split into two; each faction continuing to remain in the UDF.  A faction of the Congress (S) and the Janata (G) also joined the INC (I).

In the meantime, there were splits in the NDP and the Socialist Republican Party (SRP). The NDP group was led by Kidangoor Gopalakrishna Pillai and the SRP faction. led by Mr. Vijayarajan left the UDF, whereas the other factions of these parties stood with the Left Democratic Front.

The CPI-M took disciplinary action against their MLA, Mr. M.V. Raghavan. Consequently, he launched a new party, Communist Marxist Party (CMP). The emergence of a third front, the BJP-Hindu Munnani Front, was another political development.

Results 
Though the elections had been declared for all the 140 constituencies, the elections to two constituencies - Vamanapuram and Kottayam were countermanded following the demise of two independent candidates. While the election to the 138 constituencies was held on March 23, the elections in the other two constituencies were delayed until June 2, 1987.

The LDF secured a decisive majority in the House securing 78 seats. The UDF won 61 seats. An independent won at Ettumanoor. The third front could not open an account.

Party Wise Results

Constituency Wise Results

References

External links 
 Kerala Assembly Election DATABASE

Kerala
State Assembly elections in Kerala
1980s in Kerala